Jan Tomasz Adamus (born 16 June 1968) is a Polish conductor, organist, chamber musician, recording artist and music administrator. At present, Adamus serves as general and artistic director of the Kraków early music orchestra and mixed symphonic choir Capella Cracoviensis (since 2008). Adamus recorded a number of solo CD's including as conductor; with Baroque, Classical and Romantic church music – also playing different historical organs in Silesia. He serves as the artistic director of the International Bach Festival in Świdnica.

Adamus graduated from the Academy of Music in Kraków and the Conservatorium van Amsterdam (Sweelinck Conservatorium). He worked a conductor in Poland and abroad, invited by early music ensembles and various festivals to lead concerts from differing musical periods. In 1995–2008, Adamus was a lecturer at the Academy of Music in Wrocław and a guest lecturer at the University of Music and Performing Arts, Vienna (Universität für Musik und Darstellende Kunst) in Graz. Between 2003 and 2008, he was the artistic director of the Wrocław early music festival Forum Musicum, and from 2005 to 2008 a consultant to the International Festival Wratislavia Cantans.

Selected recordings

 Muzyka Dawnej Europy: Niemcy - Polska  Audio CD. Performer
 Harmonologia - Muzyka W Dawnym Wroclawiu Audio CD. Performer. 
 Jasnogorska Muzyka Dawna - Musica Claromontana, Vol. 22; Vol. 23; Vol. 24. Audio CD. Conductor.
 Jasnogorska Muzyka Dawna - Musica Claromontana,  Audio CD. Conductor.
Pergolesi Adriano in Siria 3CD Decca 2016
Porpora Germanico in Germania Decca 2018

Notes and references

1968 births
Living people
Polish classical musicians
Alumni of the Academy of Music in Kraków
Conservatorium van Amsterdam alumni